Zapolye is a rural locality (a village) in Kultayevskoye Rural Settlement, Permsky District, Perm Krai, Russia. The population was 3 as of 2010. There are 34 streets.

Geography 
It is located 5.5 km north-west from Kultayevo.

References 

Rural localities in Permsky District